Dennis is a populated place in Forsyth County, North Carolina, United States.

History
Thomas Dennis Waddill built a depot in 1889 about halfway between Walkertown and Walnut Cove on the Roanoke & Southern Railroad. Waddill, who owned 1700 acres in the area, also built a mansion nearby which was demolished in the 1990s. Waddill became known as The Earl of Dennis. The depot burned in the 1930s. A post office and store were once located in the community.

Geography

Dennis is located at latitude 36.2251371 and longitude -80.1700459. The elevation is 846 feet.

References

External links

Unincorporated communities in Forsyth County, North Carolina
Unincorporated communities in North Carolina